Férémandougou is a village in north-western Ivory Coast. It is in the sub-prefecture of Bako, Odienné Department, Kabadougou Region, Denguélé District. It lies just a few kilometres north of the border of Woroba District.

Férémandougou was a commune until March 2012, when it became one of 1126 communes nationwide that were abolished.

Notes

Former communes of Ivory Coast
Populated places in Denguélé District
Populated places in Kabadougou